The Auster B.4 was an unusual British development of the Auster family of light aircraft in an attempt to create a light cargo aircraft.

Design

The conventional fuselage was considerably redesigned, turning it into a pod-and-boom configuration carrying the tail unit on a high boom. The rear of the fuselage pod was equipped with clamshell doors for easy loading and unloading, and a quadricycle undercarriage was fitted, retaining the mainwheels from earlier Auster designs, but adding a tailwheel to each side of the fuselage pod. The fuselage floor had fittings for seats, cargo tie-downs, or litters for the air ambulance role.

Operational history

The prototype was exhibited at the Farnborough Air Show in September 1953.

Although evaluated by the British Army in military markings, neither civil nor military orders ensued, and no examples were constructed beyond the single prototype

Specifications

See also

References

 
 
 

Single-engined tractor aircraft
1950s British cargo aircraft
Auster aircraft
High-wing aircraft
Aircraft first flown in 1951